Hohai University (HHU) is a public research university in Nanjing, Jiangsu, China. It is under the direct administration of the Ministry of Education of China, and previously administered by the Ministry of Water Resources from 1958 to 2000. Named after "Hohai (河海)", literally means river and sea in Chinese, it is a comprehensive university famous in the disciplines related to hydrology, water resources, hydraulic engineering, coastal engineering and marine engineering and has cultivated numerous talents for the development of China's water conservancy.

Hohai University is part of the former Project 211 and the Chinese state Double First Class University Plan for National Key Universities of China. 

Hohai University ranked 501-600th globally and 60th in China for Academic Ranking of World Universities 2021.

History
Hohai Civil Engineering School was founded in 1915. Later it was merged with the Department of Engineering of National Southeastern University and became Hohai College of Engineering in 1924. It was incorporated into the Dyisyi Chungshan University, becoming the Department of Water Resources, of later National Central University in 1928.

With the establishment of the People’s Republic of China in 1949, it became the Department of Water Resources, Nanjing University. In 1952 the Departments of Water Conservancy, Hydrology, and Water Resources of Nanjing University, Jiaotong University, Tongji University, Zhejiang University and the East China Engineering School of Water Resources were merged into the East China Technical University of Water Resources. In 1985 it became what it is named today, the Hohai University, under the authority of Deng Xiaoping.

Campuses and facilities

Hohai University has three campuses, occupying a total of 132 hectares (326 acres). The main campus, covering 45 hectares (111 acres), is located at the northern foot of Qingliang Hill in Nanjing. With green shade trees, fragrant flowers in four seasons and an elegant environment, it is one of the 300 Best Green Campuses, and has won Jiangsu Provincial Award of Garden University. A secondary campus was established in February 1986 in Changzhou, a city between Shanghai and Nanjing. Fully equipped, it occupies an area of 30 hectares in the High-Tech Development Zone of Changzhou. A third campus, comprising 57.6 hectares (142 acres) in Jiangning Economic Development Zone of Jiangning District, Nanjing, began operations in September 2001.

Hohai Library consists of three libraries in three campuses with a total area of 47,000 square meters. It has more than 1.85 million books, including 120,000 Chinese and English periodicals, with 567,000 electronic books (including a CD database). Hohai University provides internet service all day.

Students can find classrooms, dining halls, shopping centers, entertainment center, gym, and swimming pool on campus.

Colleges and schools
Hohai University consists of the following colleges and schools:
 School of Law
 Graduate School
 Business School
 College of Sciences
 College of Environment
 College of Public Administration
 Business School (Changzhou Campus)
 College of Mechanics and Materials
 College of Earth Science and Engineering
 College of Hydrology and Water Resources
 College of Internet of Things Engineering
 College of Foreign Languages and Cultures
 College of Energy and Electrical Engineering
 College of Computer and Information Engineering
 College of Civil and Transportation Engineering
 College of Mechanical and Electrical Engineering
 College of Harbour, Coastal and Offshore Engineering
 College of Oceanography
 College of Water Conservancy and Hydropower Engineering
 Department of Physical Education
 Dayu College
Wentian College (Ma'anshan City)

It has nine state and provincial key laboratories and five state and provincial engineering research centers. There are three state key disciplines, eight provincial and ministerial key disciplines, five post-doctorate mobile stations, 33 Ph.D. programs, 73 Master's programs, 18 Engineering Master's programs and MBA, and 46 undergraduate programs.

Staff and students
There were over 30,000 degree students enrolled at the university in 2005, of which 7,143 were Master and Ph.D. candidates and 18,648 undergraduate students. There are over 3,000 staff members, including one academician of both the Chinese Academy of Engineering and the Chinese Academy of Sciences, one academician of the Chinese Academy of Engineering, 796 professors and associate professors, and 167 doctor's supervisors. Ten academicians are employed as adjunct professors and supervisors for Ph.D. students.

Research
The university has undertaken tasks and research projects for the Chinese government. Such programs include:
 National Natural Science Foundation of China
 National High Technology Research and Development Program (863 Program)
 Special Funds for Major State Basic Research Project (973 Project)
 Advanced Wood Science and Technology for the 21st Century (948 Project)

The university has been involved in large projects concerning water conservancy and hydropower, for instance:
 Three Gorges Dam
 South-to- North Water Diversion Project
 Xiaolangdi hydroelectric power station
 Channel dredging and regulation works for the Yangtze River Estuary
 Project of Huai River Waterway to Ocean

It has been involved in large traffic engineering construction projects such as:
 Nanjing Railway
 Nanjing-Shanghai Expressway
 Expressway in Shanfen
 Guangdong, Changjiang Second Bridge
 Runyang Yangtze River Bridge

Hohai University has won 262 prizes for scientific research work, including 19 state prizes and 185 ministerial and provincial prizes since 1995. More than 11,822 dissertations have been published in academic publications and conferences at home and abroad, over 245 scientific monographs have been printed, and nearly 94 patents has been conferred.

Cooperation and development
Hohai Cooperation and Development Committee was founded in December 2001 in response to the needs for economic construction and social development, to deepen the strength and extent of higher education serving economic construction, and to expand the channels of social participation in running a school.

The former Vice President of the Chinese People's Political Consultative Conference and the first president of the East China Technical University of Water Resources, Ms. Qian Zhengying, participated in the inaugural meeting and was elected the Honorary President of the Committee. 24 big names and scholars became commissioners. The 120 unit commissioners are from many enterprises and institutions of the government at all levels, such as departments of water conservancy, electrical power, traffic, environmental protection, education, finance, and army.

International cooperation
Hohai, with its international exchange and cooperation arrangements, was one of the first universities entitled by the State Council to confer the degrees of Doctor, Master and Bachelor upon overseas students. It has trained hundreds of Doctors, Masters and bachelor's degree students for overseas countries and districts, and has established inter-universities cooperative relationships with nearly 50 universities from more than 20 countries and districts.

Notable Alumnus
Zhang Wentian (张闻天), former General Secretary of the Chinese Communist Party, former Vice Minister of Foreign Affairs of the People's Republic of China
Mao Yisheng (茅以升), Outstanding Chinese structural engineer (regarded as the founder of modern bridge engineering in China) and social activist, member of the Chinese Academy of Engineering
Wang Huzhen (汪胡桢), Outstanding Chinese water resource engineer (Redarded as the pioneer of modern water conservancy in China), member of the Chinese Academy of Engineering
Xu Zhilun (徐芝纶), famous Chinese engineer and educator, member of Chinese Academy of Science
Yan Kai (严恺), famous Chinese water conservancy engineer, member of the Chinese Academy of Science and the Chinese Academy of Engineering, foreign member of the Mexican Academy of Sciences
Huang Wenxi (黄文熙), famous Chinese geotechnical and hydraulic structure engineer, member of the Chinese Academy of Science
Wang wenshao (汪闻韶), famous Chinese geotechnical engineer (specialize in foundation earthquake resistant design), member of the Chinese Academy of Science
Wen Fubo (文伏波), famous Chinese water conservancy engineer, member of the Chinese Academy of Engineering
Mao Zhi (茆智), famous Chinese irrigation and drainage engineer, member of the Chinese Academy of Engineering
Shen Zhujiang (沈珠江), famous Chinese geotechnical engineer, member of the Chinese Academy of Engineering
Lu Youmei (陆佑楣), famous Chinese water conservancy engineer, member of the Chinese Academy of Engineering
Wu Zhongru (吴中如), famous Chinese hydraulic structure engineer, member of the Chinese Academy of Engineering
Zheng Shouren (郑守仁), famous Chinese water conservancy and hydro-power engineer, member of the Chinese Academy of Engineering
Zhang Jianyun (张建云), Chinese hydrologist, member of the Chinese Academy of Engineering
Niu Xinqiang (钮新强), Chinese hydraulic structure engineer, member of the Chinese Academy of Engineering
Tang hongwu (唐洪武), Chinese hydraulic engineer, member of the Chinese Academy of Engineering

References

External links
Hohai University - official website
3D map of Hohai University 

 
Maritime colleges in China
Project 211
Universities and colleges in Jiangsu
Universities and colleges in Nanjing